, is an action role-playing video game which was released for the Super Nintendo Entertainment System, developed by Red Company, and published by Naxat Soft. It was published by Bullet-Proof Software in North America. The game is the sequel to the TurboGrafx-16 game Makai Prince Dorabotchan, which was only released in Japan. The characters also appeared in the Japanese Super Naxat Open golf game for Super Famicom.

Plot
The game follows the adventures of a young vampire, the title character Spike McFang, who is set to battle with the evil zombie general Von Hesler, who attempts to invade his parents' and his friend Camelia's kingdoms.

Gameplay
The game plays from a top-down perspective; the player encounters several enemies in the game and by defeating them, can gain experience points and increase his level. Spike's main weapons are his cape, that attacks in a short range (though Spike can extend its range at the risk of dizzying himself for a short time) and his hat, which can be thrown like a boomerang. He is also able to utilize magical cards with a wide variety of special effects, including, but not limited to:
Invisibility
Summoning angels and bats
Turning all foes into small, furry animals
Grabbing a balloon and floating to safety
Elemental Attacks
Powered up partner
Recovering Health

Version differences
The American release of The Twisted Tales of Spike McFang was slightly altered in relation to the original. The enemies have higher defense and after Spike gains a level, his health does not get replenished. As a result, the game was more challenging than its Japanese counterpart. The shopkeeper, Dowson, was originally a pretty blonde girl. In the American version, this was changed to a mummified creature.

Reception

Electronic Gaming Monthly lauded it as "A huge adventure game in the same vein as Zelda!" They noted the "twist is you can pick up partners along the way to help you in your quest." Their five reviewers scored it 41 out of 50, averaging 8.2 out of 10. Nintendo Power praised the game for its "good graphics" and "entertaining story" while noting that the "adventure tends to take a predetermined path" and that the text scrolls too slowly and that control is frustrating in certain situations.

GamePro gave the game a negative review, saying that the simplistic and routine gameplay and storyline make it strictly for beginning gamers. They also criticized the cute tone of the visuals, commenting, "The pleasing graphics are clean and well drawn. On the other hand, so is Barney, and no one wants to see an RPG with him in it." In 1996, Super Play ranked the game 96th on their Top 100 SNES Games of All Time.  They praised the game’s originality and the playing card theme gameplay.

References

External links
RPGClassics' Twisted Tales of Spike McFang Shrine

1993 video games
Blue Planet Software games
Kaga Create games
Red Entertainment games
Role-playing video games
Super Nintendo Entertainment System games
Super Nintendo Entertainment System-only games
Video games about vampires
Video games developed in Japan
Single-player video games
Video game sequels